Kim Dae-sung (born 5 April 1984) is a South Korean badminton player. Kim who was educated at the Miryang high school, won the silver medals at the 2002 Asian Junior Championships in the boys' doubles and team events. He also part of the national junior team that won the silver medal at the World Junior Championships, and clinched the bronze medal in the mixed doubles event. The Inha University alumni joined the Suwon city team in 2009, and became the captain of that team. Kim won the men's doubles title at the 2009 National Championships partnered with Yoo Yeon-seong. In the international level, he was the men's doubles champion at the 2015 Mongolia International tournament.

Achievements

World Junior Championships
Mixed doubles

Asian Junior Championships
Boys' doubles

BWF International Challenge/Series
Men's doubles

Mixed doubles

 BWF International Challenge tournament
 BWF International Series tournament

References

External links
 

1984 births
Living people
People from Miryang
South Korean male badminton players
Sportspeople from South Gyeongsang Province